Sturgeon is a species of fish belonging to the family Acipenseridae.

Sturgeon may also refer to:

Places

Canada
Sturgeon (provincial electoral district), a former electoral district in Alberta
Sturgeon County, a municipal district in Alberta
Fort Sturgeon, an 18th-century trading post in what is now Saskatchewan

United States
Sturgeon, Kentucky, an unincorporated community
Sturgeon, Minnesota, an unincorporated community
Sturgeon Township, St. Louis County, Minnesota
Sturgeon, Missouri, a city
Sturgeon, Pennsylvania, a census-designated place
Sturgeons Bar, a bar in the Detroit River
Sturgeon Bay, Wisconsin
Sturgeon Creek (Michigan)
Sturgeon Pool, a reservoir in New York state

Canada and the United States
Sturgeon Lake (disambiguation)
Sturgeon River (disambiguation)

Military

Sturgeon-class destroyer, a Royal Navy class from 1894 to 1911

Sturgeon-class submarine, a US Navy class of nuclear-powered fast attack submarines
Short Sturgeon, a British aircraft originally designed as a Second World War reconnaissance bomber
Short S.6 Sturgeon, a British prototype naval reconnaissance biplane 
Sturgeon, codename of messages encoded with the German World War II Siemens and Halske T52 teleprinter cypher machine

Other uses
Sturgeon (surname), a list of people with the name
Fujian Sturgeons, a Chinese Basketball Association team
Sturgeon Community Hospital, just north of Edmonton, Alberta, Canada
Sturgeon House, a house in Fairview, Pennsylvania
Sturgeons House, a Georgian house in Essex, England
Sturgeon Moon, one of the names for a full moon in August

See also
Sturgeonism
Sturgeon's law, an adage
Spurgeon (disambiguation)